Dazehu is a subdistrict of Wangcheng District, Changsha, Hunan, China. It is located on the western bank of the Xiang River. The subdistrict is bordered by the Yueliangdao Subdistrict to the South, Huangjinyuan to the West, Baishazhou, the Gaotangling Subdistricts to the North, and Dingziwan across the Xiang River to the East. The subdistrict has one residential community and three villages under its jurisdiction.

History
Dazehu was formed by the revocation of Xingcheng and the establishment of three new subdistricts in 2012. Xingcheng was formed by Dahu and Gushan in 1995. In 1997, it had 22 villages and two residential communities.

In July 2012, Xingcheng was reclassified from a town to a subdistrict. On August 28, 2012, Xingcheng was divided into three subdistricts: Baishazhou, Dazehu and Yueliangdao. 
 The Dazehu subdistrict contains Dongma residential community, Xitang, Huilong and Nantang villages.
 The Baishazhou Subdistrict contains Maqiaohe, Tengfei and huangtian three villages.  
 The Yueliangdao Subdistrict contains the Yueliangdao Residential Community, Yinxing, Zhonghualing and Daigongmiao villages.

References

Township-level divisions of Wangcheng
Wangcheng